Nadeem Ahsan (born 10 July 1963) is a Pakistani former cricketer. He played 25 first-class and 3 List A matches for several domestic teams in Pakistan between 1983 and 1987.

See also
 List of Pakistan Automobiles Corporation cricketers

References

External links
 

1963 births
Living people
Pakistani cricketers
Gujranwala cricketers
Pakistan Automobiles Corporation cricketers
Pakistan Customs cricketers
Cricketers from Sialkot